The  is a Japanese funicular line of  in Tateyama, Toyama, with its official name . The company also operates another funicular, Kurobe Cable Car with the same official name. The line is a part of Tateyama Kurobe Alpine Route. It opened in 1954.

Basic data
Distance: 
Gauge: 
Stations: 2
Vertical interval:

Stations

See also
List of funicular railways
List of railway lines in Japan
Tateyama Kurobe Alpine Route
Tateyama Sabō Erosion Control Works Service Train

External links

 Tateyama Kurobe Alpine Route official website 

Funicular railways in Japan
Rail transport in Toyama Prefecture
Tateyama Kurobe Alpine Route
Railway lines opened in 1954
1067 mm gauge railways in Japan
1954 establishments in Japan
Tateyama, Toyama